This article is about the demographic features of the population of Portugal, including population density, ethnicity, education level, health of the populace, economic status, religious affiliations and other aspects of the population.

As of 31 December 2021, Portugal had 10,352,042 inhabitants.

Portugal is a fairly linguistically and religiously homogeneous country. Ethnically the Portuguese people form 95% of the total population in Portugal. The Portuguese people are mainly a combination of ancient paleolithic populations, and the proto-Celtic, Celtic and Iberian tribes, para-Celtic Lusitanians. Some other groups, like the Romans, Germanic (Visigoths, Suevi, Buri, Alans and Vandals) and later the Moorish (Arabs and Berber), Sephardic Jewish, and the French also passed through the country.

Today, Ukrainians, Moldovans, Romanians, Russians, Bulgarians, Brazilians, Venezuelans and members of PALOP countries (Portuguese-speaking African countries) are the immigrants and form the major foreign communities in the country. Portuguese is spoken throughout the country, with only the villages of Miranda do Douro's Mirandese language recognised as a locally co-official language.

Total fertility rate from 1850 to 1899

The total fertility rate is the number of children born per woman. It is based on fairly good data for the entire period. Sources: Our World In Data and Gapminder Foundation.

Vital statistics since 1900

Current vital statistics
Source:

Maps

Other demographic statistics 

The following demographic statistics are from the World Population Review.

One birth every 7 minutes
One death every 5 minutes
One net migrant every 160 minutes
Net loss of one person every 14 minutes

The following demographic statistics are from the CIA World Factbook, unless otherwise indicated.

Population
10,302,674 (July 2020 est.)

Age structure
0-14 years: 13.58% (male 716,102 /female 682,582)
15-24 years: 10.94% (male 580,074 /female 547,122)
25-54 years: 41.49% (male 2,109,693 /female 2,164,745)
55-64 years: 13.08% (male 615,925 /female 731,334)
65 years and over: 20.92% (male 860,198 /female 1,294,899) (2020 est.)

Median age
total: 44.6 years. Country comparison to the world: 13th
male: 42.7 years
female: 46.5 years (2020 est.)

Birth rate
8.2 births/1,000 population (2020 est.) Country comparison to the world: 221st

Death rate
11.7 deaths/1,000 population (2020 est.) Country comparison to the world: 25th

Total fertility rate
1.41 children born/woman (2020 est.) Country comparison to the world: 216th

Net migration rate
0.3 migrant(s)/1,000 population (2020 est.) Country comparison to the world: 71st

Population growth rate
+0.1 (2020 est.)

Mother's mean age at first birth
30.5 years (2020 est.)
Life expectancy at birth

Source: UN World Population Prospects

Religions
Roman Catholic 81%, other Christian 3.3%, other (includes Jewish, Muslim, other) 0.6%, none 6.8%, unspecified 8.3%
note: represents population 15 years of age and older (2011 est.)

Infant mortality rate
total: 2.6 deaths/1,000 live births. Country comparison to the world: 219th
male: 3.0 deaths/1,000 live births
female: 2.3 deaths/1,000 live births (2020 est.)

Infant mortality rate

Dependency ratios
total dependency ratio: 55.8
youth dependency ratio: 20.3
elderly dependency ratio: 35.5
potential support ratio: 2.8 (2020 est.)

Urbanization
urban population: 66.3% of total population (2020)
rate of urbanization: 0.47% annual rate of change (2015-20 est.)

Literacy
definition: age 15 and over can read and write (2015 est.)
total population: 96.1%
male: 97.4%
female: 95.1% (2018 est.)

School life expectancy (primary to tertiary education)
total: 17 years
male: 17 years
female: 17 years (2018)

Unemployment, youth ages 15–24
total: 20.3%. Country comparison to the world: 66th
male: 19.8%
female: 20.9% (2018 est.)

Sex ratio
at birth: 1.05 male(s)/female
under 15 years: 1.05 male(s)/female
15–24 years: 1.06 male(s)/female
24–54 years: 0.97 male(s)/female
54–65 years: 0.84 male(s)/female
65 years and over: 0.66 male(s)/female
total population: 0.90 male(s)/female (2020 est.)

Urban organization

Metropolitan areas and agglomerations
As of 2001 Census, Portugal had two significant agglomerations: Lisbon Metropolitan Region (3.34 million inhabitants) and Northern Littoral Urban-Metropolitan Region (or Porto Metropolitan Agglomeration) with 2.99 million people, the later with a polycentric nature. These broader agglomerations are distinct from the political metropolitan areas of Lisbon and Porto – Grande Área Metropolitana de Lisboa (2,9 million) and Grande Área Metropolitana do Porto (1,7 million). Together they hold 45% of the total population.

Largest urban areas

When considering the number of inhabitants in consistent single urban areas, de facto cities in mainland Portugal, per the new with increased density of human-created structures, and excluding suburban and rural areas, Portugal has two cities with about one million inhabitants each (Lisbon and Porto), ten others with more than 50,000 inhabitants and 14 cities with populations between 20,000 and 40,000 inhabitants.

Note: the following table does not include cities in the Portuguese islands of Madeira and Azores in mid-Atlantic Ocean.

Largest cities
Portugal has 151 localities with city status (cidade). Every city is included into a municipality (município). This is a list of population by city, which means that it refers to the number of inhabitants in the city proper, excluding inhabitants from the same municipality but living outside the urban area of the city in other civil parishes (freguesias) of the municipality. In some cases, the entire municipality and the city proper cover the same territory.

Largest municipalities by population

Denotes the number of inhabitants in the municipality area; area is in km2; only for populations of over 100,000 inhabitants.

People

Nationality
noun: Portuguese (singular and plural)
adjective: Portuguese

Languages

The main language is Portuguese. Mirandês (the Mirandese language), is also recognised, and has special protection in the area of Miranda do Douro.

Immigration

In 1992, 1.3% of the population was foreign, by 2021 the number had grown to almost 7% or 698,887 people.

Since the independence of the former African colonies, Portugal saw a steady immigration from Africa, most notably Cape Verde, Angola and Guinea-Bissau, but also São Tomé and Príncipe, Mozambique and former Portuguese India in Asia.

Portugal saw migration waves due to labor shortages since 1999, first from Eastern Europe (1999–2002), in two distinctive groups, a Slav (Ukraine, Russia and Bulgaria) and an East Latin (Romania and Moldavia), that stopped and started declining as the labour market became saturated.

Since 2003, most of the immigrants came from Brazil, China and the Indian subcontinent. Family reunification was seen as important for a successful integration in the country, thus the government eased it, and in 2006, more than 6 in 10 new immigrants were family members of legal foreign residents in the country.

There is also a significant number of elderly Western European residents in search of quality of life, namely from France, Germany, the Netherlands and United Kingdom.

More recently, there is significant migration from the former Portuguese colony of Brazil, as since 2017 more than 30,000 Brazilians immigrate to Portugal annually.

Ethnic minorities and persons with disabilities

Portugal does not collect ethnicity or racial data of its population. 

Anti-racism laws prohibit and penalize racial discrimination in housing, business, and health services. In 2007 approximately 332,137 legal immigrants live in the country, representing approximately 5% of the population. The country also has a resident Romani (Gypsy) population of approximately 40,000 people.

Discrimination against persons with disabilities in employment, education, access to health care, or the provision of other state services is illegal. The law mandates access to public buildings and to newly built private buildings for such persons.

Religion

The great majority of the Portuguese population belongs to the Roman Catholic Church. Religious observance remains strong in northern areas, with the population of Lisbon and southern areas generally less devout and strongly anticlerical. Religious minorities include a little over 300,000 Protestants and Mormons. There are also about 50,000 Muslims and 10,000 Hindus. Most of them came from Goa, a former Portuguese colony on the west coast of India (Some Muslims also came from former two Portuguese African colonies with important Muslim minorities: Guinea-Bissau and Mozambique). There are also about 1,000 Jews. Portugal is also home to less than 10,000 Buddhists, mostly Chinese from Macau and a few Indians from Goa. Portugal is still one of the most religious countries in Europe, most Portuguese believe with certainty in the Existence of God and religion plays an important role in the life of most Portuguese. According to the Pew Research Center, 40% of Portuguese Catholics pray daily.

Maps
Religion by municipality according with the 2021 Census.

Literacy
definition: age 15 and over can read and write
total population: 99.62%
male: 99.55%
female: 99.63% (2015)

See also
 
Portugal
Romani people in Portugal

Notes

References

 
Society of Portugal